Bitch Magnet was an American post-hardcore band who formed in 1986 at Oberlin College in Ohio and later moved to North Carolina, United States. They released their first record in 1988. All of the band's albums were released on Communion Records in the US; they were also signed to the European labels Shigaku/What Goes On and Glitterhouse. The band disbanded in 1991. Frontman Sooyoung Park later formed the band Seam with Mac McCaughan (of Superchunk) and Lexi Mitchell. Post-Seam, Park also played guitar in Ee. David Grubbs, who was a founding member of Squirrel Bait, was briefly a member of the band while also leading Bastro. Orestes Morfin went on to drum for Walt Mink and God Rifle. Jon Fine formed Vineland and Coptic Light, and was briefly a touring guitarist for Don Caballero.

On March 31, 2011, Bitch Magnet announced that the line-up of Fine, Morfin and Park - the band's original recorded line-up - would reunite to perform at the All Tomorrow's Parties festival "Nightmare Before Christmas," held in the UK in December 2011. In addition to performing at ATP, the band also played shows in London, Brussels, Cologne and in the Netherlands at Groningen's Vera club. The band played its first reunion shows in Asia in November 2011, in Seoul and Tokyo. In the spring of 2012 Bitch Magnet played additional shows in Tokyo, Singapore, Hong Kong, and Manila. It concluded its reunion with a tour of America in autumn, 2012, performing in Seattle, San Francisco, two shows in New York, and its final show in Chicago, at the Empty Bottle.

Bitch Magnet's three albums were reissued on December 6, 2011 by Temporary Residence Limited, as a deluxe limited-edition triple-LP set and as a triple CD. The reissues include non-LP tracks and previously unreleased recordings that were remixed with John Congleton in late 2010.

Members

Final line-up
Sooyoung Park – lead vocals, bass guitar (1986–1990, 2011–2012)
Jon Fine – guitar (1986–1990, 2011–2012)
Orestes Morfín (aka Orestes Delatorre) – drums (1987–1990, 2011–2012)

Former members
Jay Oelbaum – drums (1986)
David Grubbs – guitar (1989)
David Galt – guitar (1989)
Pete Pollack – drums (1990)

Discography

Albums
Umber (1989)
Ben Hur (1990)

EPs and singles
Star Booty (1988)
"Valmead" b/w "Pea" - split with Codeine (1990, Glitterhouse also released as 12" with live versions of "Big Pining" and "Navajo Ace")
"Mesentery" & "Motor" b/w "Big Pining (alternate version)" (1990, Waterfront)
"Sadie" b/w "Where Eagles Fly" (cover of Misfits song "Where Eagles Dare") included in limited release of Ben Hur LP (1990)
"Sadie" b/w "Ducks and Drakes (live)" (1991, Caff Records)

Compilations
Endangered Species, a 6 record box set compilation of 7" singles, released by Glitterhouse,1991, contains one track by Bitch Magnet: "White Piece of Bread" (alternate side with Bullet LaVolta's "Hello There")
Bitch Magnet, a triple-CD set containing Ben Hur with "White Piece of Bread" and "Sadie", Umber with "Motor (alternate mix)", and Star Booty with alternate versions of "Sadie" and four other Umber songs.  Also released as a triple-LP set.  (Temporary Residence Limited, 2011)

Music videos
 "Mesentery" (1990)

References

External links
 [ Online history of BM]

Musical groups from Ohio
Musical groups from North Carolina
American post-hardcore musical groups
American noise rock music groups
American musical trios
Musical groups established in 1986
Musical groups disestablished in 1990
Musical groups reestablished in 2011
Glitterhouse Records artists